Publius Mummius Sisenna was a Roman politician who was consul ordinarius in 133 with Marcus Antonius Hiberus as his colleague, and governor of Roman Britain shortly afterwards. Hadrian's Wall may have been finished under his governorship.

Ronald Syme considers Sisenna's tribe "Galeria" as clear evidence that his family origins lay in Spain, and counts twenty different individuals from those provinces who shared his gentilicium.

Life 
Little is known of his career. Syme speculates that Sisenna may be identical with a "Publius" known to have been governor of Thracia between the years 128 and 136. Sisenna is attested as governor of Roman Britain in a fragmentary inscription at Wroxeter dated 14 April 135. The brief period between his consulship and governorship is unusual; he was one of only three persons known to have proceeded directly to governorship of Roman Britain without governing another province first. The sudden departure of Sextus Julius Severus to Judaea to suppress a rebellion there would explain part of this. Birley speculates that no other person was suitable for the job, and Hadrian appointed him to the ordinary consulship as a means to render Sisenna eligible more rapidly.

Another inscription shows Sisenna was to be proconsul of Asia in 150–51.

Based on the unusual name, he was kinsman to, if not father of, the suffect consul of 146 and proconsul of Asia, Publius Mummius Sisenna Rutilianus. Rutilianus served as legate of Legio VI Victrix, which was stationed in Britain, likely during the tenure of Sisenna. If they were father and son, that Rutilianus became consul only thirteen years after Sisenna suggests that the older man attained the fasces late in life.

References 

Imperial Roman consuls
Roman governors of Britain
2nd-century Romans
Sisenna
Roman governors of Asia